Kevin Edwin Cooper (born 27 December 1957) is a former English cricketer who played for Nottinghamshire, Gloucestershire and Herefordshire.

External links

1957 births
Living people
English cricketers
Gloucestershire cricketers
Nottinghamshire cricketers
Herefordshire cricketers
Cricketers from Sutton-in-Ashfield
Herefordshire cricket captains
D. H. Robins' XI cricketers
Young England cricketers